Edgewood–Colesburg Community School District is a school district headquartered in Edgewood, Iowa. It includes an elementary school in Colesburg and a secondary school in Edgewood. The district occupies sections of Clayton and Delaware counties.  The school mascot is the Vikings, and their colors are black and gold.

, Rob Busch was the superintendent, and the district was sharing services with other Iowa districts. Circa several years prior to 2016, it had 600 students, but it declined to 535 students by 2015.

Schools
The district operates two schools:
 Edgewood–Colesburg Elementary School, Colesburg
 Edgewood–Colesburg High School, Edgewood

Edgewood–Colesburg High School

Athletics
The Vikings participate in the Tri-Rivers Conference in the following sports:
Football
Cross country
Volleyball
Basketball
Wrestling
Golf
Track and field
Soccer
Baseball
Softball

See also
List of school districts in Iowa
List of high schools in Iowa

References

External links
 Edgewood-Colesburg Community School District

School districts in Iowa
Education in Clayton County, Iowa
Education in Delaware County, Iowa
School districts established in 1961
1961 establishments in Iowa